Suh Yongsun, also Yong Sun Suh or Seo Young-Sun (born 1951 in Seoul, South Korea), is a Korean painter and sculptor. In his art he mainly portrays human existence.

Suh lives and has his main studio in Gyeonggido near Seoul.

Life 

Suh Yongsun studied Fine Arts at Seoul National University from 1975 to 1982 and worked as a professor at the College of Fine Arts at this University from 1986 to 2008.
After withdrawing from his long-time professorship, he was elected Korea's Artist of the Year for 2009 and honored with a solo show at the National Museum of Contemporary Art, South Korea.

He was invited to residency programs in Vermont in the United States of America in 1995 and to the Monash University in Melbourne, Australia, both in 2006 and in 2010. He also worked at the University of Paris in 2003. In 2001 he was a visiting professor in Hamburg, Germany.

Work 
In his art, Suh brings together traditional Korean styles with Western and especially European influences such as German Expressionism and Francis Bacon.

In the early 1980s he began with painting a series of pine trees. A few years later he changed to the topic of social and historic subjects.
Since then he "explores various subjects including portrait, scenery, history, war, myth, etc, but he is most well known for his work expressing humanity in a metropolitan environment, as well as his historical series that depicts historical accidents."

Visiting New York City and Berlin strongly influenced his paintings, which often show urban scenes with roughly executed human figures that often appear masked.

Exhibitions  
Suh Yongsun's artworks have been presented in many museums.
 2011: Festart, Osaka, Japan
 2011: galerie son, Berlin
 2010: "The Flower on the Snow", Daejeon Museum of Art, Daejeon, Korea
 2009: "Artist of the Year", National Museum of Contemporary Art, Gwacheon, Korea
 2009: "Remembering the Future", Parksoogun Museum, Yanggu, Korea
 2009: "Beginning of New Era", National Museum of Contemporary Art, Seoul, Korea
 2005: Crecloo Art Gallery, New York, USA
 2004: Ilmin Museum of Art, Seoul, Korea
 2004: Gwangju Biennale, Gwangju, Korea
 2001: Cultural department of the Korean Embassy, Berlin, Germany
 2001: The Traveling Museum, National Museum of Contemporary Art, Korea, Gwacheon
 2001: Seoul Museum of Art, Seoul, Korea
 2001: Korean modern art: Reinstatement of painting, National Museum of Contemporary Art, Seoul, Korea
 2001: Exposition de echanges interuniverstaires 2001, Galerie Bernanos, Paris, France
 2000: Contemporary Art from Korea, UNESCO Palace, Beirut, Lebanon
 1999: Korea contemporary art - The sound of nature, Triangle Gallery, Calgary, Alberta, Canada
 1996: '96 Seoul Art Exhibition, Seoul City Museum, Seoul, Korea
 1995: Korea-China, Art Center, Seoul, Korea
 1993: Self Portrait Drawing, Swan Gallery, New York, USA
 1990: "Expression & Imagination", Contemporary Art Exchange Show, Dong-bang Museum of Art & Los Angeles Art Core Gallery, USA
 1987: 19th Cagnue International Painting Exhibition, Cagnue, France

Projects 
 2009: "The Wall in the World", Art Project, Berlin
 2008: Director of Tri Angle Project
 2007: Director of CheolAm Public Art Project (murals)
 2001: CheolAm mine village art project

Awards (selection) 
 2009: "Artist of the Year 2009" (National Museum of Contemporary Art, Gwacheon, Korea)

Publications 
 "1975-2007 SUH Yongsun I,II,III", Gallery 604,Busan, 2010
 "Artist of the Year 2009 SUH Yongsun", National Museum of Contemporary Art, Korea, Gwacheon, 2009
 "SUH Yongsun", Art Vivant, Sigongsa, Seoul, 1994

Notes

External links 
 
 Galerie Son website (English and German)
 "Wall in the World Project"  on the website of the Goethe-Institut with a short CV of Suh Yongsun
 Korea Digital Archives for the Arts - Suh Yongsun

1951 births
Living people
South Korean painters
South Korean contemporary artists
South Korean sculptors
Contemporary painters
Postmodern artists
People from Seoul
Seoul National University alumni
20th-century sculptors